Same-surname marriage is the marriage of two people of the same surname. Historically, same-surname marriage was considered a taboo or prohibited in China and other East Asian cultures influenced by China.

China
Initially, ancient China did not have regulation on endogamy during the Xia and Shang dynasties. A policy against same-surname marriage was first instituted during the Western Zhou. In his interpretation of the Book of Rites, philosopher Zheng Xuan compared same-surname marriage to zoophilia, and called it blasphemous; indicating the seriousness of the Zhou dynasty's opposition to it. Confucianism opposed same-surname marriage because it thought that it would lead to weakness in reproduction of offspring. Both the Guoyu and the Zuo zhuan attributed the lack of same-surname couples to concerns with their offspring.

Although Confucianism opposed same-clan name marriage, the taboo did not originate from Confucianism, and opposition to same-clan name marriage later gained support outside Confucianism. Same-surname marriage formed part of the traditional Chinese marriage system, where men and women within the same extended family were not permitted to marry, just as is the case in many patriarchal societies.

The Han dynasty did not have any statute prohibiting marriage between men and women of the same surname. Wang Mang's marriage to Empress Wang indicates that same-surname marriage was not socially unacceptable during that period, if the couple do not share the same kin. Emperor Xiaowen reintroduced a law prohibiting same-surname marriage during the Northern Wei, with a usual penalty of capital punishment. Tang dynasty law continued to treat same-surname marriage as a crime, punishable by two years of imprisonment. The Ming and Qing dynasties inherited the prohibition on same-surname marriage from Tang dynasty law; the prohibition was abolished towards the end of the Qing dynasty via judicial reforms, allowing men and women of the same surname and different kin to marry. In 1950, the People's Republic of China passed its New Marriage Law, which reduced restrictions on same-surname marriage to lineal blood relatives.

Korea 

During the Three Kingdoms Period, same-surname marriage was prevalent among the royal family and aristocracies of the Silla kingdom, in order to maintain the bloodline and strengthen royal authority. King Taejong Muyeol, for instance, was the son of King Jinji and Princess Cheonmyeong, the daughter of King Jinpyeong; Queen Jinseong married her uncle Kim Wi–Hong; and general Gim Yu-sin married Lady Jiso, the third daughter of King Taejong Muyeol. Even in the early Goryeo dynasty, same-surname marriage in the royal family was very common, and even marriages between half-siblings were performed. 

However, from the middle of the Goryeo period, due to the influence of Confucianism, marriages between close relatives started to decline, and eventually disappeared by the end of the Goryeo dynasty. During the Joseon dynasty, when Confucianism became the founding ideology of the nation, marriage between people with the same last name and ancestral family was strictly prohibited, and even marriages with relatives from the maternal blood were banned unless the parties only share a blood relative after the sixth degree.

The prohibition of same-surname marriage was recognized as part of Korean customary law during the Japanese colonial period. Following the division of Korea, the laws concerning family and marriage began to diverge. North Korean law does not formally ban marriage between people with the same last name, while the Civil Code of Republic of Korea inherited the prohibition on same-surname marriage from the colonial era.

The prohibition on same-surname marriage was continuously challenged in South Korea since the introduction of the Civil Code. Opponents argued that it was not feasible to ban such marriage simply due to surname, since the family name system in South Korea has been developed to a point where it became difficult to confirm the kinship between people with the same last name.

On July 16th, 1997, The Constitutional Court of Korea ruled that the prohibition on same-surname marriage was inconsistent with the constitution, and the law would be suspended in 1999 Currently, South Korean laws only ban marriage between people who share a blood relative within the eighth degree, whether or not the couple in question shares the same surname.

Taiwan 
Currently, Taiwanese law does not prohibit marriage base on shared surname, instead only prohibiting people who are related by blood within the sixth degree of relationship. According to statistics from the Ministry of the Interior, as of 2014 there are 174,350 same-surname couples in Taiwan, including one couple with the same surname and given name.

Vietnam 
Laws during the early part of the Lê dynasty included a provision prohibiting same-surname marriage, similar to the legal provision in China. The phrase  ("as long as the same surname") is often used.

References

Types of marriage
Mating systems
Surname
Taboo